Joseph J. Fields (born October 5, 1985 in Houston, Texas) is a former American football safety. He was signed by the Carolina Panthers as an undrafted free agent in 2008. He played college football at Syracuse.

College career
At Syracuse, Fields began his career at Quarterback. But when Andrew Robinson became the starter and Tanard Jackson left for the NFL, Fields became a safety.

NFL career
Fields played for the Carolina Panthers for a brief stint before getting cut due to injury. After being cut he did not pursue a roster spot with another team

Post-Athletic Career
Fields returned to his alma mater in 2010 as an academic graduate assistant. The next year, Fields was promoted to academic coordinator, working with the Orange football team. In 2012, Fields transitioned to work with the Orange men's basketball team. In 2017, Fields was named Associate AD for Academic Services at Texas A&M. Fields was promoted to Senior Associate AD for Student-Athlete Services at Texas A&M in March 2020.

External links
Carolina Panthers Bio
Syracuse Orange Bio
Syracuse University Athletic Department Bio
Texas A&M Announcement

1985 births
Living people
Players of American football from Houston
American football safeties
Syracuse Orange football players
Carolina Panthers players
American football quarterbacks